Listen is the fifth studio album by guitarist Doug Raney, recorded and released in 1980 on Danish label SteepleChase.

Track listing 
 "Come Rain or Come Shine" (Harold Arlen, Johnny Mercer) – 9:00
 "In a Sentimental Mood" (Duke Ellington) – 5:53
 "Autumn Song" (Bernt Rosengren) – 6:19
 "Don't Listen" (Doug Raney) – 8:26
 "Bird Feathers" (Charlie Parker) – 8:56
 "Moment's Notice" (John Coltrane) – 6:03

Personnel 
Doug Raney – guitar
Bernt Rosengren – tenor saxophone
Jesper Lundgård – bass
Billy Hart – drums

References 

Doug Raney albums
1981 albums
SteepleChase Records albums